The discography of Hostyle Gospel, an American Christian hip hop group, consists of three studio albums, three mixtapes and  four music videos.

Discography

Studio albums

Singles

Mixtapes

Videography

Music videos

References 

Hip hop discographies
Discographies of American artists
Christian music discographies
Discography